Cowleaze may refer to:

 Cowleaze Chine, a geographical feature on the Isle of Wight, England
 Cowleaze Wood, an area of woodland in south England